This is a list of notable individuals associated with the Pennsylvania State University, including graduates, former students, and professors.

Alumni

Art and literature
 Diane Ackerman, poet and naturalist
 Steve Alten, author, MEG series, Domain series, and The Loch
 John Balaban, author, poet, Words for My Daughter and Locusts at the Edge of Summer
 John Barth, writer
 John T. Biggers, African-American muralist who came to prominence after the Harlem Renaissance
 Caroline Bowman, Broadway actress
 Dale Brown, bestselling author, Act of War, Battle Born, and Plan of Attack
 Erica Cho, artist
 Jeanne Clemson, theater director, stage actress, and teacher; preserved the Fulton Opera House
 Geffrey Davis, poet
 Richard Diehl (M.A. 1965, Ph.D. 1969), Mesoamerican archaeologist and academic, expert on the Olmec civilization
 Kathleen Frank, Artist
 Alan Furst, novelist
 Jean Craighead George, Newbery Medal-winning children's author
 Aaron Gilbert (A.S. 2000) painter
 Chip Kidd, book-jacket designer
 Norris J. Lacy, expert on the Arthurian legend
 Paul Levine, novelist, Jake Lassiter crime fiction series, screenwriter, JAG and First Monday
Jerome Loving (BA), professor of American Literature and Culture at the University of Texas at Austin
 Steve McCurry, photojournalist; most known for photograph of the "Afghan Girl" in National Geographic Magazine
 Susan Miller, playwright, My Left Breast, two-time Obie winner, Eugene O'Neill Contest winner, Emmy nominee
 David Morrell, novelist, First Blood
 James Morrow, author
 Robert Neffson, artist
 Lynne Rae Perkins, Newbery Medal-winning children's author
 John Pielmeier, playwright, Agnes of God
 Dianne H. Pilgrim, art historian and museum professional; held research and curatorial positions at the Metropolitan Museum of Art, the Finch College Museum of Art, and the Brooklyn Museum of Art
 Davis Schneiderman, writer and professor at Lake Forest College
 Oliver Smith, ten-time Tony Award-winning scenic designer
 David Wagoner, poet; former chancellor of the Academy of American Poets
 Henry Wessel Jr., photographer; recipient of two Guggenheim Fellowships
 Sophia Wisniewska, university administrator
 Robert Yarber, artist

Business and industry
 Louis D'Ambrosio, former CEO of Sears Holdings Corporation
 Donald W. Davis, former CEO of Stanley Black & Decker; taught at MIT Sloan School of Management for over 20 years
 Robert E. Eberly, Chairman of Eberly Natural Gas Co.; Penn State benefactor
 Herman Fisher, co-founder of Fisher-Price toy company
 Kenneth Frazier, chairman and CEO, Merck & Co., Inc.
 Jacqueline Hinman, former CEO of CH2M HILL
 Lloyd Huck, chairman emeritus of Merck & Co., Inc. and former CEO of Nova Pharmaceutical Corp.
 Richard T. James, inventor of the Slinky
 Saad Sherida al-Kaabi, President and CEO of QatarEnergy
 Lewis Katz, former co-owner of The Philadelphia Inquirer, New Jersey Nets and New Jersey Devils
 Albert Lord, former CEO of Sallie Mae
 Mike McBath, co-founder, part-owner of the Orlando Predators
 Gertrude Michelson, businesswoman; first woman to head the board of trustees at an Ivy League University (Columbia) and first woman to sit on the board of Macy's and General Electric
 Barry Myers, former CEO of AccuWeather; nominated by Donald Trump to lead the National Oceanic and Atmospheric Administration
 Joel N. Myers, founder and CEO of AccuWeather
 Eugene O'Kelly, former CEO of KPMG
 Mark Parker, executive chairman and former CEO of Nike, Inc.
 Karen Peetz, first female president of The Bank of New York Mellon
 Terry Pegula, billionaire owner of the Buffalo Sabres and Buffalo Bills
 Alan Pottasch, advertising executive and marketer best known for his five decades of work for PepsiCo
 Uzair Qadeer, Human Resources thought leader and Chief People Officer at the British Broadcasting Corporation (BBC) 
 Hugh Ellsworth Rodham, textile wholesaler; father of Secretary of State Hillary Clinton
 Lindsay Rosenwald, doctor and life-sciences industry investor
 Alan Schriesheim, former CEO of Argonne National Laboratory
 William Schreyer, chairman emeritus and former CEO of Merrill Lynch; namesake of Schreyer Honors College
 Joanna Shields, Baroness Shields, technology executive and former British government official
 Frank Smeal, partner, Goldman Sachs; namesake of Smeal College of Business
 Jim Stengel, former global marketing officer of Procter & Gamble
 John P. Surma, former CEO of US Steel
 Paul Twomey, businessman; founding figure of ICANN
 Richard Trumka, AFL–CIO President
 Verne M. Willaman, former member of the executive committee of Johnson & Johnson
 Patricia A. Woertz, former CEO of Archer Daniel Midland; on Fortune magazine's "Most Powerful Women in Business" list

Technology, Architecture and Design
 Louis Astorino, architect,  PNC Park, University of Pittsburgh Medical Center
 Paul Blasingame, United States Air Force (USAF) officer and engineer who played an important role in the development of the Intercontinental Ballistic Missile
 Matt Brezina, co-founder of Xobni
 Robert J. Cenker, aerospace and electrical engineer; worked at RCA Astro-Electronics and its successor company GE Astro Space on a variety of spacecraft projects
 Stanley Cole (1948), architect, designer of Citizens Bank Park
 Douglas Comer, computer science professor at Purdue; designed and implemented the Xinu operating system
 Joe Fafard, sculptor; Officer of the Order of Canada, 1981
 Nelson L. Goldberg, developed the first cable system to be acquired by Comcast
 Samuel Kurtz Hoffman, engineer who specialized in rocket propulsion; developed the F-1 engines that would power the Saturn V rocket, and later worked on the Space Shuttle Main Engine
 John Hoke III, Chief Design Officer of Nike
 Jim Keller, engineer, AMD, Apple Inc. and Tesla Motors
 John Mashey, computer scientist and entrepreneur; developed the ASSIST (computing) assembler language teaching software while at Penn State
 Jef Raskin, engineer, Apple Inc.
 Der Scutt, architect; designed a number of major and notable buildings throughout New York City and the United States
 Harry Shoemaker, pioneer radio engineer
 Ross William Ulbricht, founder of the Silk Road, as "Dread Pirate Roberts"

Education
 Michael Anesko, literary critic, writer and professor; best known for his studies of Henry James and William Dean Howells
 Danielle Bassett, professor at the University of Pennsylvania; youngest individual to be awarded a 2014 MacArthur fellowship
 Samuel Preston Bayard, musicologist; established the folklore program at Penn State
 Robert D. Braun, academic and aerospace engineer; Space Sector Head at the Johns Hopkins University Applied Physics Laboratory and former NASA Chief Technologist
 M. Christopher Brown II, President of Alcorn State University
 T. Colin Campbell, chemist and professor; Jacob Gould Schurman Professor Emeritus of Nutritional Biochemistry at Cornell University
 Jason De León, professor at UCLA; MacArthur Fellow (2017)
 Walter Dobrogosz, professor; best known for his discovery and further research on the probiotic bacterium Lactobacillus reuteri
 Paul M. Doty, former Mallinckrodt Professor of Biochemistry at Harvard University
 Thomas R. Dye, Emeritus Professor of Political Science at Florida State University
 John Friedlander, mathematician; fellow of the American Mathematical Society
 A. Roberto Frisancho, biological anthropologist; Arthur F. Thurnau Professor of Anthropology at the University of Michigan
 Roland Fryer, Robert M. Beren Professor of Economics at Harvard University, a MacArthur fellow, and recipient of the John Bates Clark Medal.
 Edwin R. Gilliland, chemical engineer; former Institute Professor at the Massachusetts Institute of Technology
 Graham Harman, philosopher and academic
 James T. Harris III, president of Widener University
 Marci Hamilton, professor at the University of Pennsylvania
 John W. Heston, president of Washington State University, South Dakota State University and Dakota State University
 David C. Hodge, President of Miami University in Oxford, Ohio
 Richard Hoover, former president of Hastings College
 Kate Hutton, seismologist; monitored earthquakes at California Institute of Technology for 37 years
 Dugald C. Jackson, electrical engineer; headed the Department of Electrical Engineering of the Massachusetts Institute of Technology from 1907 to 1935
 William Jaco, mathematician; known for his role in the JSJ decomposition theorem
 M. Eric Johnson, Dean of the Owen Graduate School of Management, Vanderbilt University
 Mark L. Knapp, Distinguished Teaching Professor Emeritus at the University of Texas at Austin; internationally known for his research on nonverbal communication
 George Koob, professor; director of the National Institute on Alcohol Abuse and Alcoholism
 Leah Krubitzer, neuroscientist; Professor of Psychology at University of California, Davis and MacArthur Fellow (1998)
 Max G. Lagally, Erwin W. Mueller Professor and Bascom Professor of Surface Science at the University of Wisconsin–Madison
 Steven Leath, president of Iowa State University from 2012 to 2017 and Auburn University from 2017 to 2019; appointed to the National Science Board in 2018
 Herbert E. Longenecker, former president of Tulane University
 Ronald Mallett, theoretical physicist; best known for his scientific position on the possibility of time travel
 Robert McGrath, director of Renewable and Sustainable Energy Institute
 Eoin McKiernan, early scholar in Irish Studies
 Lane Mitchell, ceramic engineer; founded Georgia Tech's School of Materials Science and Engineering
 John Pickles, Phillips Distinguished Professor of International Studies in the Department of Geography at the University of North Carolina at Chapel Hill
 Robert B. Pippin, professor at University of Chicago
 Jonathan K. Pritchard, genetics professor at Stanford University
 Tatiana Proskouriakoff, Mayanist scholar and archeologist; contributed significantly to the deciphering of Maya hieroglyphs
 James Purdy, scholar of digital rhetoric
 Merritt Roe Smith, historian; Leverett and William Cutten Professor of the History of Technology at the Massachusetts Institute of Technology
 Richard Somerville, climate scientist; Distinguished Professor Emeritus at Scripps Institution of Oceanography at the University of California, San Diego
 George D. Stoddard, former president of the University of Illinois and the University of the State of New York; former chancellor of New York University and Long Island University
 Ian Waitz, vice chancellor at the Massachusetts Institute of Technology
 William Hultz Walker, chemist and professor; former chair of industrial chemistry at the Massachusetts Institute of Technology and former president of the American Electrochemical Society
 James J. Whalen, former president of Ithaca College
 Robert E. Witt, president of University of Alabama
 Iris Marion Young, political and social theorist, Professor of Political Science at the University of Chicago
 Koraly Pérez-Edgar, McCourtney Professor of Child Studies and Professor of Psychology at Pennsylvania State University

Entertainment and media
 Gerald W. Abrams, television producer; father of J.J. Abrams
 John Aniston, actor, Days of Our Lives; father of actress Jennifer Aniston
 Brian Baker, former Sprint spokesman
 Donald L. Barlett, investigative journalist; two-time Pulitzer Prize winner
 Peter Barnes (journalist), journalist; senior Washington correspondent for the Fox Business Network
 Donald P. Bellisario, television producer
 Charles Bierbauer, television journalist
 Edward Binns, actor, 12 Angry Men, Fail Safe
 Lindsey Broad, actress, The Office, Benders
 Benjy Bronk, comedian and writer, The Howard Stern Show
 Ryan Buell, founder of the Paranormal Research Society on A&E
 Ty Burrell, actor, star of ABC sitcom Modern Family
 Jeff Cardoni, composer; known for work on television projects such as CSI: Miami, Silicon Valley, and The League
 Margaret Carlson, journalist, pundit; first female columnist for TIME
 Leon Carr, songwriter and composer
 Victoria Cartagena, actress, The Bedford Diaries, Gotham
 Jimmy Cefalo, journalist and sports broadcaster
 Nathan Cook, actor, The White Shadow, Hotel
 Jill Cordes, TV personality, HGTV's My First Place and The Best Of
 John A. Dalles, hymn writer and clergyman
 Bruce Davison, actor; received an Oscar nomination for his role in Longtime Companion
 Steven E. de Souza, screenwriter; Judge Dredd, Beverly Hills Cop III, 48 Hrs., Die Hard
Eileen DeSandre, actress
 Julius J. Epstein, screenwriter of Casablanca
 Patrick Fabian, actor, Better Call Saul
 Carmen Finestra, Emmy Award-winning television writer and producer; The Cosby Show, Home Improvement
 Jonathan Frakes, actor and director (Star Trek: The Next Generation)
 Sara Ganim, journalist; won 2012 Pulitzer Prize for Local Reporting, third-youngest winner of a Pulitzer Prize
 Erica Grow, meteorologist, WPIX in New York City
 Kim Jones, clubhouse reporter for the New York Yankees and the YES Network
 Christine Kay, journalist; conceived and edited the Portraits of Grief profile series on the victims of the September 11 attacks
 Keegan-Michael Key, actor, comedian; MADtv, host of Animal Planet's The Planet's Funniest Animals
 Don Roy King, director for Saturday Night Live from 2006 until 2021
 Peter W. Klein, journalist and documentary filmmaker; founder of the Global Reporting Centre
 Stan Lathan, television producer and director, co-creator of Def Comedy Jam
 Paul Levine, lawyer, novelist, screenwriter, author of the "Jake Lassiter" and "Solomon vs. Lord" series
 Rick Lyon, actor/creator of Broadway show Avenue Q
 Adam McKay, film director and screenwriter; writer and director of Anchorman: The Legend of Ron Burgundy, Talladega Nights: The Ballad of Ricky Bobby, and The Landlord
 Norman Charles Miller, journalist; Pulitzer Prize winner
 Vance Packard, journalist and social critic; author of The Naked Society
 Amy Wynn Pastor, TV personality, TLC's Trading Spaces
 Paul Pringle, journalist; three-time Pulitzer Prize winner
 Mike Reid, Grammy Award-winning songwriter
 Ian Rosenberger, 3rd place in Survivor: Palau on CBS; former President of Penn State's USG
 Michael S. Rosenfeld, talent agent and co-founder of Creative Artists Agency
 Lisa Salters, ESPN reporter and former Nittany Lady Lion Basketball Star
 Herb Sargent, television writer and producer; worked on The Tonight Show and Saturday Night Live, created Weekend Update with Chevy Chase
 Lara Spencer, co-anchor of Good Morning America
 Joonas Suotamo, Chewbacca actor in Star Wars: The Force Awakens, former Penn State Basketball forward/center
 Don Taylor, film actor of the 1940s and 1950s
 Tom Verducci, senior writer for Sports Illustrated
 Andrew Kevin Walker, screenwriter of Seven
 Fred Waring, bandleader
 Mel Welles, actor and director
 Rake Yohn, CKY crew; Jackass crew member; synthetic metal chemist

Politics, government, and military
 Harry J. Anslinger, first commissioner of the U.S. Treasury Department's Federal Bureau of Narcotics during the presidencies of Herbert Hoover, Franklin D. Roosevelt, Harry S. Truman, Dwight D. Eisenhower, and John F. Kennedy
 William P. Atkinson, former member of the Wisconsin State Assembly
 Kelly Ayotte, former United States Senator (R-NH)
 William Binney, former intelligence official and whistleblower associated with the Trailblazer Project 
 Dana H. Born, lecturer in public policy at the Harvard Kennedy School of Government and retired brigadier general in the United States Air Force 
 Donald Burdick, United States Army Major General and Director of the Army National Guard
 Christopher F. Burne, Brigadier General, United States Air Force
 Caroline Casagrande, member of the New Jersey General Assembly
 Kathleen L. Casey, Commissioner of the U.S. Securities and Exchange Commission
 Frank A. Cipolla, Brigadier General, United States Army Reserve
 Jake Corman, member of the Pennsylvania State Senate (R-PA 34)
 Andrew Curtin; Civil War Governor of Pennsylvania (1861–1867)
 Timothy DeFoor, Auditor General of Pennsylvania
 Charlie Dent, former United States Congressman (R-PA-15)
 Andy Dinniman, Pennsylvania State Senator
 Michael F. Doyle, United States Congressman (D-PA 14)
 Thomas V. Falkie, served as the 14th director of the U.S. Bureau of Mines
 Howard Fargo, former member of the Pennsylvania House of Representatives
 Tom Feeney, former United States Congressman (R-FL 24) and former Speaker of the Florida House of Representatives
 John Sydney Fine, former Pennsylvania Governor (1951–1955)
 Jon D. Fox, former United States Congressman (R-PA 13) and former member of the Pennsylvania House of Representatives (R-PA 153)
 Barbara Hackman Franklin, former United States Secretary of Commerce
 Harold Gehman, former commander-in-chief of the U.S. Joint Forces Command and former NATO Supreme Allied Commander, Atlantic
 J. D. Gordon, former Pentagon spokesman, national television commentator, columnist
 Huban A. Gowadia, US Government official; former Deputy Administrator of the Transportation Security Administration
 Josh Green, Governor of Hawaii
 Priscilla Guthrie, former Associate Director of National Intelligence and Chief Information Officer
 Jay Hammond, politician; former Governor of Alaska
Patrick J. Harkins, Member of the Pennsylvania House of Representatives
 B. Frank Heintzleman, former Governor of Alaska Territory
 Caroline C. Hunter, member of the Federal Election Commission (FEC)
 Alan Isaacman, attorney, argued the case Hustler Magazine v. Falwell before U.S. Supreme Court
 Arthur Horace James, former Pennsylvania Governor (1939–1943)
 John James, U.S. representative from Michigan's 10th congressional district 
 Robert Jubelirer, former President Pro Tempore of the Pennsylvania State Senate, former Lieutenant Governor of Pennsylvania
 Theodore H. Kattouf, former US Ambassador to Syria
 C. Robert Kehler, commander of Air Force Space Command
Tom Killion, Pennsylvania State Representative for the 168th district (2003–2016), Pennsylvania State Senator for the 9th Senatorial District (2016–present)
 Maria Leavey, political strategist
 Mary Beth Long, US government official
 Lee Ju-yeol, Governor of the Bank of Korea
 Roger A. Madigan (1930–2018), Pennsylvania State Senator and Representative
 John L. McLucas, FAA administrator, Secretary of the Air Force, Director of NRO, President of MITRE
 Edward B. Montgomery, economist and politician; former United States Deputy Secretary of Labor
 Jill Morgenthaler, retired Colonel United States Army and Illinois politician
 Michael P. Murphy, United States Navy SEAL and Medal of Honor recipient
 Thomas Murt, member of the Pennsylvania House of Representatives (R-PA 152)
 Bonnie Newman, member of the Reagan and George H. W. Bush administrations, chief of staff to Judd Gregg
 Bernie O'Neill, member of the Pennsylvania House of Representatives (R-PA 29)
 William Pagonis, director of American logistics during the Gulf War
Kevin Parker, New York state senator
 Scott Perry, United States Congressman (R-PA 4)
 William Perry, former United States Secretary of Defense
 Michael Piwowar, acting SEC chair from January to May 2017
 Valerie Plame, former CIA officer
 Russell Redding, Pennsylvania Secretary of Agriculture
 Tom Ridge, first United States Secretary of Homeland Security; 43rd governor of Pennsylvania
 Hugh Edwin Rodham, politician; brother of Secretary of State Hillary Clinton
 James Patrick Rossiter, Mayor of Erie, Pennsylvania
Russell Ruderman, member of the Hawaii State Senate
 Rick Santorum, former United States Senator (R-PA) and United States Congressman (R-PA 18)
 Richard Schweiker, former United States Senator (R-PA) and Secretary of Health and Human Services
Saad Ali Shire, current Minister of Finance of Somaliland, former Foreign Minister of Somaliland, and former Minister of Planning of Somaliland
 D. Brooks Smith, Senior United States circuit judge of the United States Court of Appeals for the Third Circuit
 Samuel H. Smith, member and Speaker of the Pennsylvania House of Representatives (R-PA 66)
 Donald Snyder, member of the Pennsylvania House of Representatives, 1981–2000; Majority Whip
 Stanley Sporkin, former judge of the United States District Court for the District of Columbia
 Su Jain-rong, Finance Minister of the Republic of China (Taiwan)
 Adrian Tam, Hawaii State Representative
 Lyonpo Jigme Thinley, Prime Minister of Bhutan
 Glenn Thompson, United States Congressman (R-PA 15)
 George J. Trautman, III, Lieutenant General, United States Marine Corps
 Slobodan Uzelac, Deputy Prime Minister of the Croatian government
 William E. Ward, General, United States Army
 R. Seth Williams, former District Attorney of Philadelphia
 Frank Wolf, former United States Congressman (R-VA 10)
 John J. Yeosock, United States Army Lieutenant General who commanded the 3rd U.S. Army during Operation Desert Shield and Operation Desert Storm
 John Yudichak, Pennsylvania State Senator for the 14th district since 2011
 Francisco Sagasti, Interim President of Peru as of November 2020
 Joe Pitts, American Fighter Pilot

Science and medicine
 Elliott Abrams, Accuweather meteorologist
 Cynthia Beall, anthropologist; research on people living in extremely high mountains became the frontier in understanding human evolution and high-altitude adaptation
 Paul Berg, recipient of 1980 Nobel Prize in Chemistry
 Deborah Birx, physician and diplomat; served as the White House Coronavirus Response Coordinator under President Donald Trump from 2020 to 2021
 Theodore H. Blau, first clinician in independent practice to be elected president of the American Psychological Association
 Guion Bluford, astronaut, first African-American in space
 Benjamin Bloom, educational psychologist; made contributions to the theory of mastery learning
 Lois Bloom, developmental psychologist and Edward Lee Thorndike Professor Emerita of Psychology and Education at Teachers College, Columbia University
 David Bohm, quantum physicist known for the Aharanov-Bohm effect, Bohm diffusion, and Bohm interpretation
 Roscoe Brady, neuroscientist and senior investigator at the National Institutes of Health
 Zena Cardman, geobiologist and NASA astronaut
 John M. Carpenter (B.S. 1957), nuclear engineer, Fellow of the American Association for the Advancement of Science
 Robert Cenker, Space Shuttle astronaut, STS-61-C
Jane C. Charlton, professor of astronomy and astrophysics
 Dennis S. Charney, Dean of Mount Sinai School of Medicine in New York City
 Bin Chen, Material scientist at NASA Ames Research Center
 John Call Cook, played a crucial role in establishing the field of ground-penetrating radar; received the first PhD in Geophysics at Penn State in 1951
 William R. Cotton, meteorologist; developed the Regional Atmospheric Modeling System (RAMS) with Roger A. Pielke
 Luther Cressman, field archaeologist; most widely known for his discoveries at Paleo-Indian sites such as Fort Rock Cave and Paisley Caves
Muriel Davisson, neuroscientist
 Delbert Day, engineer; co-inventor of TheraSphere glass microspheres for medical and dental applications and Glasphalt which recycles waste glass for use in asphalt paving
Shawn Domagal-Goldman (Ph.D.), astrobiologist at NASA
 Ted Eisenberg, D.O., Guinness World Record holder for most breast augmentation surgeries performed
 Nina Fedoroff, plant geneticist, member of the U.S. National Academy of Science
 Gregory S. Forbes, meteorologist, severe thunderstorm and tornado expert, The Weather Channel severe weather expert
 Raymond D. Fowler, psychologist and former president of the American Psychological Association
 Robert F. Fudali, (Ph.D.), geochemist
 James T Harris III (D.Ed. 1988), educator and academic administrator; 2003 Alumni Fellow Award recipient
 William Kenneth Hartmann, planetary scientist; first to convince the scientific mainstream that the Earth had once been hit by a planet sized body (Theia (Planet))
 Eunseong Kim, experimental low temperature physicist
 Nina G. Jablonski, Evan Pugh Professor Anthropology, Fellow American Philosophical Society, Fellow American Academy of Arts and Sciences
 Paul Julian, meteorologist; with Roland A. Madden, discovered the atmospheric phenomena known as the Madden–Julian oscillation
 Gardner Lindzey, psychologist and former president of the American Psychological Association
 Daniel H. Lowenstein, physician; known for his work in the field of epilepsy 
 Stephen L. Mayo, professor at the California Institute of Technology; William K. Bowes Jr. Leadership Chair in the Division of Biology and Biological Engineering and the Bren Professor of Biology and Chemistry; elected to the United States National Academy of Sciences in 2004 and was appointed to a six-year term on the National Science Board in 2013
 Shirley M. Malcom, Senior Advisor and Director of SEA Change at the American Association for the Advancement of Science; trustee of California Institute of Technology
 Chad Mirkin, chemist focusing on nanotechnology; member of the President's Council of Advisors on Science and Technology, NAS, NAE, and IOM
 Prasant Mohapatra, Computer Scientist; Vice Chancellor of University of California Davis
 Erwin Wilhelm Müller, physicist; inventor of the field ion microscope; first person to "see" an atom
 SonBinh Nguyen, Dow Chemical Company Research Professor of Chemistry at Northwestern University
 Ross Overbeek, computer scientist; known for work at the Argonne National Laboratory
 Charles G. Overberger, Chemist; former president of the American Chemical Society
 Stuart Patton, dairy scientist known for his research in the fields of milk chemistry
 Charles S. Parker, botanist and head of Department of Botany (1932–1948), Howard University
 James Pawelczyk, Space Shuttle astronaut, STS-90
 Paolo Piccione, mathematician president of the Brazilian Mathematical Society 2017
 Roger A. Pielke, meteorologist; spearheaded development of the Regional Atmospheric Modeling System (RAMS) with William R. Cotton
 Tomaž Pisanski, mathematician; considered by many Slovenian mathematicians to be the "father of Slovenian discrete mathematics"
 Jef Raskin, author and human–computer interface expert, known for starting the Macintosh project for Apple Computer
 David L. Reich, President and COO of the Mount Sinai Hospital in New York City, Chair of the Department of Anesthesiology, Horace W. Goldsmith Professor of Anesthesiology, known for use of electronic medical records for large-scale retrospective investigations
 Charles M. Rick, plant geneticist and botanist who pioneered research on the origins of the tomato; Guggenheim Fellow
 Bernard Rimland, research psychologist; influential in the field of developmental disorders
 Louis Rosen, nuclear physicist; "father" of the Los Alamos Neutron Science Center accelerator; worked on the Manhattan Project during World War II
 Rustum Roy, physicist; professor at Penn State and leader in materials research; former member of National Academy of Engineering
 Samuel Philip Sadtler, chemist; first President of the American Institute of Chemical Engineers
 Mike Seidel, meteorologist; reporter at The Weather Channel since 1992
 Richard Bruce Silverman, Patrick G. Ryan/Aon Professor of Chemistry at Northwestern University; known for the discovery of pregabalin, which is marketed by Pfizer under the brand name Lyrica
 Vaclav Smil, professor, author, scientist and policy analyst
 Fred Tappert, physicist whose primary contributions were in underwater acoustics
 Robert Titzer, professor and infant researcher
 Ben Wang, industrial engineer and director of the Georgia Tech Manufacturing Institute
 Warren M. Washington, atmospheric scientist; former chair of the National Science Board and current senior scientist at the National Center for Atmospheric Research
 Owen Webster, distinguished member of the organic and polymer chemistry communities
 Paul J. Weitz, astronaut, Skylab 2, STS-6
 Mary Louisa Willard, scientist internationally recognized for her work in microscopy and forensic science

Sports

 David Aardsma, major league pitcher spent 1 semester before transferring to Rice University
 Monica Aksamit (born 1990), saber fencer who won a bronze medal at the 2016 Summer Olympics in the Women's Saber Team competition.
 John Amaechi, former professional basketball player; BBC, ITV, and SKY television personality
 Adrian Amos, NFL player, Green Bay Packers
 Richie Anderson, former NFL running back
 LaVar Arrington, All-Pro NFL linebacker; radio personality
 Horace Ashenfelter, 1952 Olympic gold medalist, track and field
 Charlie Atherton
Chris Babb (born 1990), basketball player in the Israeli Basketball Premier League
 Britt Baker, professional wrestler and dentist
 Mark Baldwin, former Major League baseball player
 Saquon Barkley, NFL running back, NFL Rookie of the Year (2018), NFL Pro Bowl (2018)
 Terry Bartlett, Olympic gymnast
Talor Battle, basketball player who last played for Hapoel Tel Aviv of the Israeli League
 Alex Bentley, WNBA player, Connecticut Sun
 Todd Blackledge, retired NFL quarterback; television sports analyst
 Saeed Blacknall, NFL wide receiver
 Calvin Booth, NBA center
 NaVorro Bowman, NFL linebacker for the San Francisco 49ers
 Kyle Brady, NFL tight end
 Frank Brickowski, former professional basketball player
 Jim Britton, MLB pitcher
 Courtney Brown, NFL defensive end and No. 1 overall NFL draft pick
 Gary Brown, Cleveland Browns running backs coach; former NFL running back
 Nate Bump, professional baseball player
 John Cappelletti, Heisman Trophy winner and subject of book Something for Joey
Tony Carr (born 1997), basketball player in the Israeli Premier Basketball League
 Ki-Jana Carter, NFL halfback and No. 1 overall NFL draft pick
 Ken Chertow, US wrestling team and Olympian, 1986–1993
 Mary Ellen Clark, 1992 and 1996 Olympic bronze medalist, diving
 Kerry Collins, Pro Bowl NFL quarterback and 4,000-yard passer (2002)
 Shane Conlan, former NFL linebacker
 Dan Connor, NFL linebacker for the Dallas Cowboys
 Frank Coonelly, President, Pittsburgh Pirates
 Bob Coulson, former Major League Baseball player
 Birdie Cree, former Major League Baseball player
 Joe Crispin, professional basketball player
 Patrick Cummins, 2004 NCAA runner-up wrestler; mixed martial arts fighter, currently competing in the UFC
 Helen Darling, WNBA guard for the San Antonio Silver Stars
 Phil Davis, current Bellator MMA Light Heavyweight (205 lb) contender
 D.J. Dozier, former NFL running back
 Cal Emery
 Bobby Engram, NFL wide receiver with the Seattle Seahawks
 Jim Farr
 Kevin Foley, PGA Tour golfer
 Bill Ford
 Tim Frazier, NBA player, Washington Wizards
 Mitch Frerotte, former NFL guard with the Buffalo Bills
 Sam Gash, former professional fullback, Baltimore Ravens, New England Patriots, Buffalo Bills; current Detroit Lions assistant coach
 Robert Gibson
 Garry Gilliam, NFL player
 John Gilmore, NFL tight end
 Shaul Gordon (born 1994), Canadian-Israeli Olympic sabre fencer
 Robbie Gould, professional kicker for the San Francisco 49ers
 Milt Graff
 Rosey Grier, former professional football player
 Hinkey Haines, football player
 Tamba Hali, NFL defensive lineman
 Jack Ham, former professional football player
 Micha Hancock, US Olympic gold medalist in women's volleyball.
 Christa Harmotto, US Olympic silver and bronze medalist in women's volleyball.
 Franco Harris, former NFL running back
 Jeff Hartings, All-Pro NFL offensive lineman
 Michael Haynes, NFL defensive end
 Cliff Heathcote, former Major League Baseball player
 Dan Heisman, chess master
 Alan Helffrich, Olympic athlete; winner of gold medal in 4×400 m relay at the 1924 Summer Olympics
 George Hesselbacher
 Jordan Hill, NFL player, Seattle Seahawks
 Megan Hodge, US Olympic silver medalist in women's volleyball.
 Mike Hull, NFL player
 Tom Irwin, former Major League Baseball player
 Bubba Jenkins (attended), 2008 runner-up, 2011 National Champion wrestler at 157 lbs., professional MMA fighter
 Larry Johnson, Pro Bowl NFL running back
 Joel Johnston
 John Jones
 Bhawoh Jue, NFL safety
 Joe Jurevicius, NFL wide receiver
 Jeremy Kapinos, NFL Pittsburgh Steelers punter
 Jimmy Kennedy, NFL defensive tackle
 Ed Klepfer, former Major League Baseball player
 Pip Koehler
Joe Kovacs, USATF Olympic shot putter. Won world championships in 2015 and 2019.
 Ali Krieger, professional women's soccer player, United States Women's National Soccer Team, Orlando Pride
 Tom Lawless
 Sean Lee, NFL linebacker for the Dallas Cowboys
 Al Leiter, former MLB All-Star and World Series champion
Trey Lewis (born 1992), basketball player in the Israeli Basketball Premier League
 Ken Loeffler, former La Salle University men's basketball coach
 Maggie Lucas, WNBA player, Indiana Fever
 David Macklin, NFL cornerback
 Michael Mauti, NFL player, New Orleans Saints
Mandy Marquardt, USA Cycling National Team
 Kelly Mazzante, professional basketball player
 Mike McBath, co-founder and part owner of the Orlando Predators
 Suzie McConnell-Serio, former professional basketball player, current coach
 Kerry McCoy, two-time United States Olympian in wrestling; current coach of Stanford University wrestling
 O. J. McDuffie, former NFL wide receiver
 Irish McIlveen
 Kareem McKenzie, NFL offensive lineman
 John McNulty, wide receivers coach, Arizona Cardinals
 Matt Millen, former professional football player former president of the Detroit Lions
 Mike Missanelli, host of The Mike Missanelli Show on 97.5 The Fanatic Philadelphia sports talk radio station.
 Lenny Moore, former NFL running back
 Bob Mrosko, NFL player
 Mike Munchak, Pro Football Hall of Fame offensive guard, former Tennessee Titans head coach, current Pittsburgh Steelers offensive line coach
 Danny Musser
 Alyssa Naeher, professional women's soccer player, United States Women's National Soccer Team, Chicago Red Stars
 Jim O'Hora, former football player, football coach
 Phil Page
 Micah Parsons, NFL linebacker for Dallas Cowboys
 Paul Pasqualoni, defensive line coach, Dallas Cowboys; former Syracuse head coach
 Darren Perry, former professional football player; current safeties coach, Green Bay Packers
 Cumberland Posey, founded the Homestead Grays in 1912
 Paul Posluszny, NFL linebacker for the Jacksonville Jaguars
 Eldon Price, university basketball coach and other positions; 19 years with Penn State's Beaver campus, two years as Director of Basketball Operations at Penn State University
 Andrew Quarless, tight end on the Super Bowl XLV Champion Green Bay Packers
 Allen Robinson, NFL player, Jacksonville Jaguars 
 Hatch Rosdahl, defensive lineman for the 1966 AFL champion Kansas City Chiefs
 Allen Rosenberg, rower and rowing coach
 Ed Ruth, three-time NCAA collegiate wrestling champion, professional Mixed Martial Artist, currently for Bellator MMA
 Jon Sandusky, Director of Player Personnel, Cleveland Browns
 Mike Scioscia, former Major League Baseball catcher and current manager
 Chad Severs, professional soccer player
 Bud Sharpe, former Major League Baseball player
 Jack Sherry, captain of the 1954 Final Four Team
 Alan Strange, former Major League Baseball player
 Bill Stuart
 Kevin Tan, Olympic bronze medalist (gymnastics, team)
 David Taylor, 4× State Champion wrestler, 2× NCAA Champion
 Joe Tepsic
 Myles Thomas, former Major League Baseball player
 Wallace Triplett, former NFL running back; first African-American draftee to play in the NFL
 Kristal Uzelac, former U.S. Olympian
 Russ Van Atta, former Major League Baseball pitcher
 John Montgomery Ward, former Major League Baseball player, manager, and executive
 Haleigh Washington, US Olympic gold medalist in women's volleyball.
Mike Watkins (born 1995), basketball player for Hapoel Haifa in the Israeli Basketball Premier League
 Tiffany Weimer, professional soccer player for the FC Gold Pride in the WPS
 Trevor Williams, football player

Notable professors and coaches
 Gregory Ain, architect, Head of the Department of Architecture, 1963–67
 Richard Alley, glaciologist and climate scientist, IPCC lead author
 Paul Amato, sociologist
 George Andrews, mathematician
 Henry P. Armsby, agriculturalist chemist, inventor of the animal respiration calorimeter
 Larry Catá Backer, Cuban-American legal and international relations scholar
 Stephen Barrett, psychiatrist and webmaster of Quackwatch, taught health education from 1987 to 1989
 John Barth, novelist and short story author
 Samuel Preston Bayard, folklorist, expert on fife and fiddle tunes
 Leann Birch, developmental psychologist, Director of the Center for Childhood Obesity Research
 Chrystelle Trump Bond, dancer, choreographer, and dance historian
 Christian M. M. Brady, targumist and former Dean of Schreyer Honors College
 Cynthia Brewer, professor and head of the Department of Geography, notable for her contributions to cartographic visualization and the invention of ColorBrewer
 Simon J. Bronner, folklorist; professor emeritus of American Studies
 Velvet Brown, tuba soloist and recording artist; is associate professor of music
 O. Richard Bundy, Director of Athletic Bands, including the Penn State Blue Band
 Donald Byrne, coach of America's first varsity chess team
 John M. Carroll, studied human–computer interaction
 Paul F. Clark, professor of labor studies and head of the Department of Labor Studies and Employment Relations
 Paul DeMaine, a founder of the Computer Science Department
 Norman C. Deno, professor of Chemistry and seed germination researcher 
 Jose Dolores Fuentes, atmospheric chemist, professor of meteorology
 William K. George, fluid dynamicist
 Lee Giles, co-creator of CiteSeer, David Reese Professor of Information Sciences and Technology; former Program Manager, Air Force Office of Scientific Research
 Kathryn Gines, professor of philosophy
 Mary Godfrey, assistant professor of art education, the first African American faculty member
 Joseph Heller, author of Catch-22
 Joshua Melko, professor of chemistry at the University of South Florida
 Vasant Honavar, professor, artificial intelligence and machine learning, and bioinformatics researcher and educator, former Program Director, National Science Foundation
 Ivan Illich, polymath: author, philosopher, and polemicist
 Mary Jane Irwin, computer scientist, National Academy of Science member
 Philip Jenkins, professor of religious studies and writer on modern religious controversies
 James Kasting, atmospheric chemist and astrobiologist, aka "Dr. Habitable Zone"
 Gary N. Knoppers, head of the Department of Classics and Ancient Mediterranean Studies; wrote a lengthy and prominent two-volume commentary on I Chronicles
 Bohdan Kulakowski, professor of mechanical engineering; head of the Pennsylvania Transportation Institute (PTI) from 1992 to 2003
 Alan MacEachren, professor of geography, notable for his contributions to geographic visualization
 Michael E. Mann, professor of atmospheric science, IPCC lead author, known for the hockey stick graph
 Mark D. Maughmer, developed first successful winglet designs for gliding competitions; aerodynamicist; author
 John D. McCarthy, professor of sociology, notable for his contributions to social movement studies and resource mobilization theory
 Webb Miller, one of the pioneers of computational biology; co-creator of BLAST, a research tool used by geneticists worldwide
 Michael G. Moore, pioneer of online learning and theory of distance education; listed (Routledge, 2017) as one of "most influential thinkers about education of all time"
 Erwin Wilhelm Müller, inventor of the field emission microscope, field ion microscope, and atom probe; first person to view atoms
 Robert Neffson, artist
 Masatoshi Nei, theoretical population geneticist and evolutionary biologist
 Jon Nese, lecturer in meteorology and former Weather Channel personality
 Joe Paterno, head football coach, 1966–2011
 Roger Penrose
 Rene Portland, head women's basketball coach, 1980–2007
 C. R. Rao, 2002 National Medal of Science-winning statistician
 Frank Ritter
 Theodore Roethke, 1954 Pulitzer Prize for Poetry recipient
 Russ Rose, Women's volleyball head coach since 1979 and university professor
 Mary Beth Rosson
 Richard Russo, Pulitzer Prize–winning author of Empire Falls; his novel Straight Man was drawn from his experiences teaching at Penn State Altoona
 Saad Ali Shire, Minister of Finance of Somaliland
 Cael Sanderson, 2004 Olympic gold medalist in freestyle wrestling at 84 kg; current head wrestling coach
 Jerry Sandusky, former assistant football coach 1969–1999, a period during which he committed crimes that led to the Penn State child sex abuse scandal
 Kenneth Bernard Schade, sexual offender; founder of the Singing Boys of Pennsylvania
 Lee Smolin, theoretical physicist
 William Tenn (pen name of Philip Klass), science fiction writer
 David Titley professor of meteorology, NOAA's chief operating office 2012–2013, US Navy rear admiral and chief oceanographer
 Susan Trolier-McKinstry, materials scientist
 Alan Walker, paleoanthropologist
 James Z. Wang
 William C. Waterhouse, mathematician, two-time recipient of the Lester R. Ford Award
 Frank C. Whitmore, pioneering organic chemist who described the mechanism of carbocation reactions
 James Wines, artist, founder of SITE
 Aleksander Wolszczan, discoverer of first extrasolar planets and pulsar planets
 Qiming Zhang, professor of Electrical Engineering and Materials Science and Engineering
 Jerry Zolten,  music historian and producer of Grammy Award winning gospel and roots music albums

References

Penn State University people